The 2016 Holy Cross Crusaders football team represented the College of the Holy Cross as a member of the Patriot League during the 2016 NCAA Division I FCS football season. Led by 13th-year head coach Tom Gilmore, Holy Cross compiled an overall record of 4–7 with a mark of 2–4 in conference play, placing fifth in the Patriot League. The Crusaders played their home games at Fitton Field. They finished the season 4–7, 2–4 in Worcester, Massachusetts.

Schedule

Game summaries

at Morgan State

at New Hampshire

at Albany

Dartmouth

at Lafayette

Bucknell

Harvard

Lehigh

at Colgate

at Georgetown

vs. Fordham

References

Holy Cross
Holy Cross Crusaders football seasons
Holy Cross Crusaders football